Jennie Clarke may refer to:
 Jennie Everton Clarke, American orphanage founder
 Jennie Thornley Clarke, American educator, writer, and anthologist

See also
 Jennie Loriston-Clarke, British equestrian